Phaonia jaroschewskii, the hairy canary fly, is a yellow European muscid fly. This species is found on sphagnum moss on healthy wet bog ecosystems. The larvae feed on these sphagnum bog mosses. It is of interest as an indicator of the health of these bogs, as it will disappear if the bog deteriorates.  For this reason the hairy canary fly is one of the species listed in the United Kingdom Biodiversity Action Plan.

References

  Notable invertebrates associated with lowland heathland 
  (2001): A Supplement to the Diptera Fauna of Lithuania

External links
 UK Biodiversity Website

Diptera of Europe
Muscidae
Insects described in 1888
Taxa named by Johann Andreas Schnabl